Political history is the narrative and survey of political events, ideas, movements, organs of government, voters, parties and leaders. It is closely related to other fields of history, including diplomatic history, constitutional history, social history, people's history, and public history. Political history studies the organization and operation of power in large societies.

From approximately the 1960s onwards, the rise of competing subdisciplines, particularly social history and cultural history, led to a decline in the prominence of "traditional" political history, which tended to focus on the activities of political elites. In the two decades from 1975 to 1995, the proportion of professors of history in American universities identifying with social history rose from 31% to 41%, and the proportion of political historians fell from 40% to 30%.

Political world history 

The political history of the world examines the history of politics and government on a global scale, including international relations.

Aspects of political history
The first "scientific" political history was written by Leopold von Ranke in Germany in the 19th century.  His methodologies profoundly affected the way historians critically examine sources; see historiography for a more complete analysis of the methodology of various approaches to history. An important aspect of political history is the study of ideology as a force for historical change. One author asserts that "political history as a whole cannot exist without the study of ideological differences and their implications." Studies of political history typically centre around a single nation and its political change and development. Some historians identify the growing trend towards narrow specialization in political history during recent decades: "while a college professor in the 1940s sought to identify himself as a "historian", by the 1950s "American historian" was the designation."

From the 1970s onwards, new movements challenged traditional approaches to political history. The development of social history  shifted the emphasis away from the study of leaders and national decisions, and towards the role of ordinary people, especially outsiders and minorities. Younger scholars shifted to different issues, usually focused on race, class and gender, with little room for elites. After 1990 social history itself began to fade, replaced with postmodern and cultural approaches that rejected grand narrative.

United States: The new political history
Traditional political history focused on major leaders and had long played a dominant role beyond academic historians in the United States. These studies accounted for about 25% of the scholarly books and articles written by American historians before 1950, and about 33% into the 1960s, followed by diplomacy. The arrival in the 1960s and 1970s of a new interest in social history led to the emergence of the "new political history" which saw young scholars put much more emphasis on the voters' behavior and motivation, rather than just the politicians.  It relied heavily on quantitative methods to integrate social themes, especially regarding ethnicity and religion. The new social science approach was a harbinger of the fading away of interest in Great Men. The eclipse of traditional political approaches during the 1970s was a major shock, though diplomatic history fell even further. It was upstaged by social history, with a race/class/gender model. The number of political articles submitted to the Journal of American History fell by half from 33% to 15%. Patterson argued that contemporary events, especially the Vietnam War and Watergate, alienated younger scholars away from the study of politicians and their deeds. Political history never disappeared, but it never recovered its dominance among scholars, despite its sustained high popularity among the reading public. Some political historians made fun of their own predicament, as when William Leuchtenburg wrote, "the status of the political historians within the profession has sunk to somewhere between that of a faith healer and a chiropractor.  Political historians were all right in a way, but you might not want to bring one home to meet the family." Others were more analytical, as when Hugh Davis Graham observed:
The ranks of traditional political historians are depleted, their assumptions and methods discredited, along with the Great White Man whose careers they chronicled.

Britain
Readman (2009) discusses the historiography of British political history in the 20th century. He describes how British political scholarship mostly ignored 20th century history due to temporal proximity to the recent past, the unavailability of primary sources, and the potential for bias. The article explores how transitions in scholarship have allowed for greater interest in 20th century history among scholars, which include less reliance on archival sources, methodological changes in historiography, and the flourishing of new forms of history such as oral history.

Germany
In the course of the 1960s, however, some German historians (notably Hans-Ulrich Wehler and his cohort) began to rebel against this idea, instead suggesting a "Primacy of Domestic Politics" (Primat der Innenpolitik), in which the insecurities of (in this case German) domestic policy drove the creation of foreign policy.  This led to a considerable body of work interpreting the domestic policies of various states and the ways this influenced their conduct of foreign policy.

France
The French Annales School had already put an emphasis on the role of geography and economics on history, and of the importance of broad, slow cycles rather than the constant apparent movement of the "history of events" of high politics.  It downplayed politics and diplomacy. The most important work of the Annales school, Fernand Braudel's The Mediterranean and the Mediterranean World in the Age of Philip II, contains a traditional Rankean diplomatic history of Philip II's Mediterranean policy, but only as the third and shortest section of a work largely focusing on the broad cycles of history in the longue durée ("long term").  The Annales were broadly influential, leading to a turning away from political history towards an emphasis on broader trends of economic and environmental change.

Social history

In the 1960s and 1970s, an increasing emphasis on giving a voice to the voiceless and writing the history of the underclasses, whether by using the quantitative statistical methods of social history or the more postmodern assessments of cultural history, also undermined the centrality of politics to the historical discipline. Leff noted how social historians, "disdained political
history as elitist, shallow, altogether passe, and irrelevant to the drama of everyday lives."

History of political regimes and institutions
MaxRange data is a project that defines and shows in detail the political status and development of institutional regimes of all states in the world from 1789. MaxRange also describes the background, development, external sources and major causes behind all political changes.
MaxRange is a dataset defining level of democracy and institutional structure (regime-type) on a 100-graded scale where every value represents a unique regimetype. Values are sorted from 1-100 based on level of democracy and political accountability. MaxRange defines the value (regimetype) corresponding to all states and every month from 1789 to 2015 and updating. MaxRange is created and developed by Max Range, and is now associated with the university of Halmstad, Sweden

See also
 Historiography
 Diplomatic history
 Social history

References

Further reading 
 Callaghan, John, et al. eds.,  Interpreting the Labour Party: Approaches to Labour Politics and History (2003) online; also online free; British 
 Craig, David M. "'High Politics' and the 'New Political History'". Historical Journal (2010): 453–475; British online
 Elton, G. R. The practice of history (1968), British.
 French, John D.. "Women in Postrevolutionary Mexico: The Emergence of a New Feminist Political History", Latin American Politics and Society, (2008) 50#2, pp. 175–184.
 Huret, Romain, "All in the Family Again? Political Historians and the Challenge of Social History", Journal of Policy History, 21 (no. 3, 2009), 239–63.
 Kowol, Kit. "Renaissance on the Right? New Directions in the History of the Post-War Conservative Party". Twentieth Century British History 27#2 (2016): 290–304. online
 Pasquino, Gianfranco. "Political History in Italy," Journal of Policy History July 2009, Vol. 21 Issue 3, pp. 282–297; discusses  political historians such as Silvio Lanaro, Aurelio Lepre, and Nicola Tranfaglia, and studies of Fascism, the Italian Communist party, the role of the Christian Democrats in Italian society, and the development of the Italian parliamentary Republic. excerpt
 Ranger, Terence. "Nationalist historiography, patriotic history and the history of the nation: the struggle over the past in Zimbabwe". Journal of Southern African Studies 30.2 (2004): 215–234.
 Readman, Paul. "The State of Twentieth-Century British Political  History", Journal of Policy History, July 2009, Vol. 21 Issue 3, pp. 219–238
Smith, Anthony D. The nation in history: historiographical debates about ethnicity and nationalism (UP of New England, 2000)
 Sreedharan, E. A manual of historical research methodology. (Trivandrum, Centre for South Indian Studies, 2007.
 Sreedharan, E. A textbook of historiography: 500 BC to AD 2000 (New Delhi: Orient Longman, 2004).

In USA
 Bogue, Allan G. "United States: The 'new' political history." Journal of Contemporary History (1968) 3#1 pp: 5–27. in JSTOR.
 Brinkley, Alan. "The Challenges and Rewards of Textbook Writing: An Interview with Alan Brinkley". Journal of American History 91#4 (2005): 1391–97 online; focus on political history
 Gillon, Steven M. "The future of political history". Journal of Policy History 9.2 (1997): 240–255, in USA.
 Graham, Hugh Davis. "The stunted career of policy history: a critique and an agenda". Public Historian 15.2 (1993): 15–37; policy history is a closely related topic online.
 Jacobs, Meg, William J. Novak, and Julian Zelizer, eds. The democratic experiment: New directions in American political history (Princeton UP, 2009).
 Jensen, Richard J. "Historiography of American Political History" in Jack Greene, ed., Encyclopedia of American Political History (Scribner's, 1984), vol 1. pp 1–25 online
 Larson, John Lauritz, and Michael A. Morrison, eds. Whither the Early Republic: A Forum on the Future of the Field (U of Pennsylvania Press, 2012).
 Leuchtenburg, William E. "The Pertinence of Political History: Reflections on the Significance of the State in America", Journal of American History 73, (1986), 585–600.
 Newman, Richard. "Bringing Politics Back in... to Abolition." Reviews in American History 45.1 (2017): 57–64.
 Silbey, Joel H. "The State and Practice of American Political History at the Millennium: The Nineteenth Century as a Test Case". Journal of Policy History 11.1 (1999): 1–30.
 Swirski, Peter (2011). American Utopia and Social Engineering in Literature, Social Thought, and Political History. New York, Routledge.

External links

 Conference: Rethinking Modern British Studies, 2015, numerous papers and reports on the historiography of British politics. Abstracts of 2015 papers
 scholarly journal Diplomatic History
Documents of Diplomatic History
Fletcher School at Tufts International Relations Resources
 A New Nation Votes: American Elections Returns 1787–1825
  French Website of the  Comité d'histoire parlementaire et politique (Parliamentary and Political History Committee) and Parlement(s), Revue d'histoire politique, published three times a year. It contains a lot of information about French political history, including about 900 references of scholarly political history studies and a bibliography of parliamentary history.

 
Fields of history